John L. Dorgan, known as Ike Dorgan, was a bookbinder, boxing manager, press agent, and publicity manager for the Madison Square Garden. He was a founding partner of The Ring magazine.

Biography

Dorgan was born in San Francisco, California, in April 1879, one of at least 11 children—six sons and five daughters – of Thomas J. and Anna R. Dorgan née Tobin. Among his siblings were Thomas A. "Tad" Dorgan, a prominent cartoonist and creator of "Indoor Sports," as well as a well-known sportswriter; Richard "Dick" Dorgan, a cartoonist, writer, and illustrator; and Joseph V. "Joe" Dorgan.

Ike Dorgan was a bookbinder (very early in his career), boxing manager (for Harry Ebbets and Frank "Fighting Dentist" Moran), press agent (for boxing promoter George L. "Tex" Rickard), and publicity manager for the Madison Square Garden. He was a founding partner of The Ring magazine in February 1922 and remained with this influential publication until his retirement in 1930.

Tad Dorgan was inducted into the International Boxing Hall of Fame in 2007 in the category of "Observer"; that is, print and media journalists, publishers, writers, historians, photographers, and artists. Ironically, Ike Dorgan has not yet been inducted into the International Boxing Hall of Fame.

References

1879 births
20th-century deaths
American boxing managers
Year of death missing
Bookbinders